The 2017 season was Felda United's 11th competitive season and 7th consecutive season in the top flight of Malaysian football, Liga Super.

Foreign players

Competitions

Overview

{| class="wikitable" style="text-align: center"
|-
!rowspan=2|Competition
!colspan=8|Record
!rowspan=2|Started round
!rowspan=2|Current position / round
!rowspan=2|Final position / round
!rowspan=2|First match	
!rowspan=2|Last match
|-
!
!
!
!
!
!
!
!
|-
| Liga Super

| —
| 3rd
| 3rd
| 21 January
| 28 October
|-
| Piala FA

| Round of 32
| Round of 32
| Round of 32
| 14 February
| 14 February
|-
| Piala Malaysia

| Group stage
| Semi-finals
| Semi-finals
| 4 July
| 21 October
|-
| AFC Cup

| Group stage
| Group stage
| Group stage
| 21 February
| 3 May
|-
! Total

Results and fixtures

Liga Super 

Source: Fixtures / Result

League table

Piala FA

Piala Malaysia

Group stage

Quarter-finals

Semi-finals

AFC Cup

Group stage

Squad statistics

Appearances
{| class="wikitable" style="text-align:center"
|-
!rowspan="1" valign="bottom"|No.
!rowspan="1" valign="bottom"|Pos.
!rowspan="1" valign="bottom"|Name
!rowspan="1" width="85"|League
!rowspan="1" width="85"|Piala FA
!rowspan="1" width="85"|Piala Malaysia
!rowspan="1" width="85"|AFC Cup
!rowspan="1" width="85"|Total
|-
|align=left|1||align=left|GK||align=left| Kalamullah Al-Hafiz
|0||0||0||0||0
|-
|align=left|2||align=left|DF||align=left| Dino Djulbic
|8||0||10||0||18
|-
|align=left|3||align=left|DF||align=left| Norfazly Alias
|7+4||1||1+1||5||14+5
|-
|align=left|6||align=left|MF||align=left| Muhd Rizqi Azman
|0||0||0||0||0
|-
|align=left|7||align=left|DF||align=left| Khairul Ismail
|0+2||0||0||0||0+2
|-
|align=left|8||align=left|FW||align=left| Thiago Augusto Fernandes
|9||0||9||0||18
|-
|align=left|9||align=left|FW||align=left| Norshahrul Idlan
|15+4||1||6+2||5||27+6
|-
|align=left|10||align=left|MF||align=left| Zah Rahan Krangar (Vice-captain)
|20||1||9+1||6||36+1
|-
|align=left|11||align=left|MF||align=left| Wan Zack Haikal
|12+2||0||6+4||2||20+6
|-
|align=left|12||align=left|DF||align=left| Shukor Adan (Captain)
|19+1||1||9||3+1||32+2
|-
|align=left|13||align=left|MF||align=left| Mohd Rafiq Shah Zaim
|0||0||0||0||0
|-
|align=left|14||align=left|FW||align=left| Ifedayo Olusegun
|8+1||0||8+1||0||16+1
|-
|align=left|15||align=left|DF||align=left| K. Prabakaran
|4||0||3||0||7
|-
|align=left|16||align=left|MF||align=left| Stuart Wark
|17+2||1||6||6||30+2
|-
|align=left|17||align=left|FW||align=left| Fakrul Aiman Sidid
|1+7||0+1||1||1+2||3+10
|-
|align=left|18||align=left|DF||align=left| Mohd Aizulridzwan Razali
|3+2||1||0+1||1+2||5+5
|-
|align=left|19||align=left|MF||align=left| Fazrul Hazli Kadri
|4+7||0+1||0||0+3||4+11
|-
|align=left|20||align=left|DF||align=left| Wan Amirul Afiq Wan Abdul Rahman
|13+3||0||5+2||5||22+5
|-
|align=left|21||align=left|MF||align=left| Mohd Syahid Zaidon
|3+2||0||0||3+1||6+3
|-
|align=left|23||align=left|DF||align=left| Safwan Hashim
|3+1||0||4+2||0||7+3
|-
|align=left|24||align=left|GK||align=left| Ilham Amirullah Razali
|0||0||2||1||3
|-
|align=left|25||align=left|DF||align=left| Ahmad Azriddin Rosli
|2+4||0||1+1||0+1||3+6
|-
|align=left|26||align=left|DF||align=left| Hasni Zaidi Jamian
|7+2||1||1+1||1||10+3
|-
|align=left|27||align=left|MF||align=left| Hadin Azman
|12+3||1||2+4||5+1||20+8
|-
|align=left|28||align=left|MF||align=left| Alif Yusof
|16+2||0||9||5||30+2
|-
|align=left|29||align=left|MF||align=left| Curran Singh Ferns
|8||0||6+3||0||14+3
|-
|align=left|30||align=left|GK||align=left| Mohd Farizal Harun
|22||1||8||5||36
|-
|align=left|31||align=left|DF||align=left| Ali Imran Alimi
|0||0||0+1||0||0+1
|-
|align=left|32||align=left|MF||align=left| Muhammad Danial Amier Norhisham
|1+4||0||4+3||0||5+7
|-
! colspan="15" style="background:#dcdcdc; text-align:center;"| Left club during season
|-
|align=left|4||align=left|DF||align=left| Muhd Ilham Yusuf
|0||0||0||0||0
|-
|align=left|5||align=left|DF||align=left| Mootaz Jounaidi
|12||1||0||5||18
|-
|align=left|8||align=left|FW||align=left| Lucas Cano
|9+2||0||0||5||14+2
|-
|align=left|29||align=left|MF||align=left| Mohd Ridzuan Abdunloh
|0+2||0||0||1||1+2
|-
|align=left|23||align=left|FW||align=left| Gastón Cellerino
|7+4||1||0||1+4||9+7
|-
|align=left|–||align=left|DF||align=left| Mohd Farid Ramli
|0||0||0||0||0
|-

Top scorers
The list is sorted by shirt number when total goals are equal.
{| class="wikitable sortable" style="font-size: 95%; text-align: center;"
|-
!width=10|
!width=10|
!width=10|
!width=150|Player
!width=80|Liga Super
!width=80|Piala FA
!width=80|Piala Malaysia
!width=80|AFC Cup
!width=80|Total
|-
|rowspan=1|1
||FW
||9
|align=left| Thiago Augusto
||14
||0
||4
||0
||18
|-
|2
||FW
||14
|align=left| Ifedayo Olusegun
||5
||0
||4
||0
||9
|-
|3
||MF
||10
|align=left| Zah Rahan Krangar
||3
||0
||3
||2
||8
|-
|4
||FW
||8
|align=left| Lucas Cano
||6
||0
||0
||0
||6
|-
|rowspan=3|5
||FW
||9
|align=left| Norshahrul Idlan
||4
||0
||0
||1
||5
|-
||MF
||11
|align=left| Wan Zack Haikal
||3
||0
||2
||0
||5
|-
||MF
||27
|align=left| Hadin Azman
||2
||0
||2
||1
||5
|-
|rowspan=3|8
||DF
||12
|align=left| Shukor Adan
||1
||0
||1
||0
||2
|-
||MF
||19
|align=left| Fazrul Hazli Kadri
||0
||0
||0
||2
||2
|-
||FW
||23
|align=left| Gastón Cellerino
||1
||0
||0
||1
||2
|-
|rowspan=3|11
||MF
||16
|align=left| Stuart Wark
||1
||0
||0
||0
||1
|-
||MF
||21
|align=left| Syahid Zaidon
||0
||0
||0
||1
||1
|-
||MF
||32
|align=left| Danial Amier
||0
||0
||1
||0
||1
|-
|- class="sortbottom"
|colspan=4|Total
|39
|0
|17
|7
|59
|-

*Player names in bold denotes player that left mid-season

Clean sheets
The list is sorted by shirt number when total clean sheets are equal.
{| class="wikitable sortable" style="font-size: 95%; text-align: center;"
|-
!width=10|
!width=10|
! scope=col style="width:160px;"|Player
!width=80|Liga Super
!width=80|Piala FA
!width=80|Piala Malaysia
!width=80|Total
|-
|1
|| 30
|align=left| Mohd Farizal Harun
||4
||0
||1
||5
|-
|- class="sortbottom"
|colspan=3|Total
|4
|0
|1
|5
|-

Transfers
First transfer window started in December 2017  to 22 January 2017 and second transfer window started on 15 May 2017 to 11 June 2017.

In

First window

Second window

Out

First window

Second window

Loan in

First window

Loan out

Second window

References

Felda United F.C.
Malaysian football clubs 2017 season